Have Another Beer with Fear is the third studio album by American punk band Fear, released in 1995. Although Lee Ving was the only remaining original member at the time of recording, the album contains a number of tracks written by previous original members. Many of the songs were written and played during the band's brief 1992 reunion tour.

Track listing
All songs by Lee Ving, except where noted.

Personnel
Lee Ving – vocals, guitar
Sean Cruse – guitar, vocals
Scott Thunes – bass
Andrew Jaimez – drums

References

1995 albums
Fear (band) albums